The 1900 European Figure Skating Championships were held on January 21 in Berlin, German Empire. Elite figure skaters competed for the title of European Champion in the category of men's singles. The competitors performed only compulsory figures.

Results

Men

Judges:
 Dr. I. von Forssling 
 J. Olbeter 
 A. Schiess 
 H. Ehrentraut 
 Dr. Kurt Dannenberg

References

Sources
 Result List provided by the ISU

European Figure Skating Championships, 1900
European Figure Skating Championships
European 1900
European Figure Skating Championships, 1900
1900 in German sport
1900s in Berlin
January 1900 sports events
Sports competitions in Berlin